Cocktail is the début album from the Mexican electropop band Belanova.
The album was recorded in Mexico City in 2002 and finally released on 14 February 2003 without promotion. The album spent its first months on the shelves, but then radio picked up the first single, "Tus Ojos."  By the summer of 2003, the album had entered the album charts reaching its peak position of number-five and number-three on the Mexican Latin Albums Chart. The band embarked on a 100-concert tour across the Mexican territory and the album finally reached Gold (50,000 Copies sold) status after three official singles. The Mexican edition of Rolling Stone named the album, Cocktail, one of the best five albums of 2003.
In 2005 the album was re-issued on reduced priced collections by Universal Music Mexico, because of this the sales of the album increased considerably, re-entering on the Mexican Top 100 Albums at seventy-nine and peaking at fifty-four after a few weeks. The album has been re-issued on Universal Music's slide-pack collections, making it the first time that the album has been available outside of Mexico.

Track listing

Credits
 Production: Belanova & Alex Midi Ortega in Virus Studios, Mexico
 Executive production: Alex Midi Ortega and Alex Enriquez
 Additional mix: Rodolfo Vazquez in Manu Studios, Mexico
 Mixing assistant: Mariano Armendáriz
 Mastered by Ron Boustead in Precision Mastering, Hollywood, California
 Scratches: Israel Sosa "DJ Pepster" [Track 2]
 Acoustic guitar: Sergio Mendrigal [Track 8], Nomo [Tracks 4 & 9]
 Art direction and design: Raul Rodrigo
 Photography: Fernando Aceves
 Make-up: Silvia García Barragán

2003 debut albums
Belanova albums